İpekçi (also spelled Ipakchi) is a Turkish and Iranian Azeri surname. İpekçi means in Turkish "someone who produces or deals in silk". 

it may refer to:

Surname
 Abdi İpekçi, Turkish journalist
 Handan İpekçi, Turkish screenwriter
 İsmail Cem İpekçi, Turkish politician

Places named for Abdi İpekçi
 Abdi İpekçi Arena
 Abdi İpekçi Avenue, Şişli, İstanbul
 Abdi İpekçi Avenue, Bayrampaşa, İstanbul

Iranian-language surnames
Turkish-language surnames